Balweg (marketed as Balweg, the Rebel Priest) is a 1987 Filipino biographical action drama film directed by Antonio Perez. Inspired by the life of Catholic priest turned communist rebel Conrado Balweg, it stars Phillip Salvador as the eponymous rebel, alongside Rio Locsin, Tetchie Agbayani, Johnny Delgado, Pinky Amador, Jose Romulo, Mon Godiz, Bebong Osorio, Eddie Infante, and Baldo Marro. Produced by Viva Films, Balweg was released on July 8, 1987, and was a box office success. Phillip Salvador won both the FAMAS Award and the Film Academy of the Philippines Award for Best Actor.

The film received negative reviews from critics, who deemed it an "opportunistic" film which excessively depicts Balweg as a "larger-than-life hero" at the expense of a fair depiction of his character and motivation. Some members of communist organizations in the Philippines also criticized the film's various historical inaccuracies.

Cast
Phillip Salvador as Fr. Balweg / Ka Ambo
Rio Locsin as Azon 
Tetchie Agbayani as Ka Susan
Johnny Delgado as Ka George
Pinky Amador as Terry Guerrero
Jose Romulo as Macli-ing Dulag
Mon Godiz
Bebong Osorio as Ka Jvy
Eddie Infante as Lakay 
Baldo Marro as Abraham
Ray Ventura as Ka Efren
Lucita Soriano as Ka Minda
Gwen Colmenares as Ka Rita
Alex Toledo as Ka Badong
Apol Salonga as Fr. de Vega
Ding Salvador as Fr. Torry
Rene Hawkins as military officer
Nemie Gutierrez as Lt. Cruz
Gregg de Guzman
Ernie Forte as Waldo
Ernie David
Eric Francisco

Production
Balweg is director Antonio "Butch" Perez's first film in six years, after his solo debut feature film Haplos. It is also actress Tetchie Agbayani's first film since she came back to the Philippines from Hollywood.

Perez asserted that they did not fictionalize any element in Conrado Balweg's story for the film, stating that "The people concerned are still alive[,] we had to be very careful. It was only a matter of putting things to dramatic structure." According to the cast, filming in the Cordilleras was a difficult experience, with actor Phillip Salvador suggesting that "Butch was doing the most difficult movie of the year."

Music
Richard Reynoso sang the theme song to Balweg.

Release
Balweg was released on July 8, 1987, with free tie-in T-shirts and stickers handed out to "lucky" moviegoers. The film was a box office success.

Critical response
Balweg received generally negative reviews from critics.

Mike Feria, writing for the Manila Standard, criticizing the film as "[a] confused and opportunistic film about a confused and opportunistic personality." He faulted its lack of "dramatic intensity", with there being no satisfactory explanation for Balweg's motivations as a rebel, and considered it as another example of a film that does not seek to illuminate the "rationalization" of rebellion by the depicted person, but instead highlights the exploits of a rebel through a larger-than-life depiction for a mass audience. However, Feria noted that there were competent performances given by Johnny Delgado and Eddie Infante, while the action scenes were adequately staged. Later in his year-end assessment of Philippine cinema, Feria observed that Balweg was one of the few films given serious effort by filmmakers that "were at best, adequate in technical aspects but largely manipulative...." JC Nigado, also writing for the Manila Standard, shared in Feria's negative sentiments on the film, finding it to be a "self-serving" film in its glorified depiction of Balweg. He wrote that "In trying to portray Balweg as a larger-than-life hero, [...] the movie only succeeds in doing the opposite as it unwittingly depicts the man as an opportunist wanting in direction."

Historical accuracy
In the magazine Philippine News and Features (PNF), five members of the Communist Party of the Philippines and the New People's Army (CPP-NPA) who allegedly knew Balweg while he was an NPA member released a collective critique of the film, stating that the film unfairly treats Balweg as a central figure in the struggle of people in the Cordilleras. They also highlighted the numerous inaccuracies they found within the film, such as the claim that the CPP-NPA were not accepted by the Cordillera people; according to them, "hundreds and hundreds" of Cordillerans were already recruited to the CPP-NPA. They also claimed that instead of the film's depiction of Balweg's group confronting the military in the early 1980s and being decimated, in actuality Balweg's unit was not actively battling anyone during that period of time.

Accolades

References

External links

1987 films
1980s action drama films
1980s biographical films
1987 action films
Cultural depictions of Filipino men
Filipino-language films
Films about communism
Films about rebels
Films set in 1974
Films set in 1979
Films set in the 1980s
Films set in Abra (province)
Films set in Kalinga (province)
Philippine action films
Philippine biographical films
Viva Films films